Keezhapalur is a village in the Ariyalur taluk of Ariyalur district, Tamil Nadu, India.

Demographics 

 census, Keezhapalur had a total population of 4458 with 2275 males and 2183 females.

References 

Villages in Ariyalur district

Educationational Institution MEERA Arts and Science College for Women